"Tiburón" (Spanish: Shark) is a salsa song by Rubén Blades and Willie Colón which appeared on their 1981 album Canciones del Solar de los Aburridos. The song is a metaphor for American intervention in Latin America, with the titular shark representing the influence of American imperialism in the region. Throughout the second half of the song, the singers shout the phrase, "si lo ven que viene, ¡palo al tiburón!" ("If you see him coming, [bring a] stick to the shark!")

Reception 
Music critic Dave Marsh listed "Tiburón" as one of his top 20 political songs written after 1976, calling it "the original anti-Central America invasion protest." At the time of its release, American radios played the song infrequently, and it was heavily unpopular among the Cuban community in Miami. In a 1991 interview, Colón said that politically charged songs like "Tiburón" and "Pedro Navaja" were so controversial that he and Blades occasionally performed them in bulletproof vests.

References 

Spanish-language songs
Rubén Blades songs
1981 songs
Songs written by Rubén Blades
Willie Colón songs
Protest songs
Songs about the United States